The 2009 Los Angeles Sparks season is the 13th season for the Los Angeles Sparks of the Women's National Basketball Association. Lisa Leslie announced that the 2009 season would be her last. On June 5, the Sparks and Farmers Insurance Group of Companies announced a multi-year marketing partnership that includes a branded jersey sponsorship. The Farmers Insurance branded jersey will be worn by the players for the first time on June 6. As part of this alliance, the Farmers Insurance name and logo will appear on the front of the Sparks jerseys and will have considerable visibility in the Staples Center during home games. Los Angeles became only the second WNBA team to finalize such an agreement. The Sparks attempted to reach the playoffs and were successful.

Offseason
On May 13, Sparks star Candace Parker gave birth to a baby girl. It is the first child for the WNBA’s reigning MVP and rookie of the year and husband Shelden Williams of the Boston Celtics. Goodwin Sports Management announced the baby girl was born in Los Angeles. She weighed 7 pounds, 6 ounces and was 20 inches long.

Dispersal Draft
Based on the Sparks' 2008 record, they would pick 9th in the Houston Comets dispersal draft. The Sparks waived their pick.

WNBA Draft
The following are the Sparks' selections in the 2009 WNBA Draft.

Transactions
June 5: The Sparks waived Jessica Moore.
June 4: The Sparks waived Ashley Paris and Marta Fernandez.
May 18: The Sparks waived Britney Jordan.
May 7: The Sparks signed Kristi Harrower to a training camp contract.
May 5: The Sparks then traded the pick from the Liberty and Rafaella Masciadri to the Minnesota Lynx in exchange for Noelle Quinn.
May 5: The Sparks traded Sidney Spencer to the New York Liberty in exchange for a first round 2010 WNBA Draft pick.
April 14: The Sparks signed Betty Lennox.
April 14: The Sparks waived Murriel Page.
March 26: The Sparks traded Temeka Johnson to the Phoenix Mercury in exchange for a first-round 2010 WNBA Draft pick.
March 25: The Sparks signed Marta Fernandez.
March 12: The Sparks signed Tina Thompson.
January 30: The Sparks traded Christi Thomas to the Minnesota Lynx in exchange for Vanessa Hayden-Johnson.
December 17, 2008: The Sparks traded the rights to Chamique Holdsclaw to the Atlanta Dream in exchange for the 13th pick in the 2009 WNBA Draft.
April 21, 2008: The Sparks traded their first-round draft pick in the 2009 WNBA Draft to the Washington Mystics as part of the Taj McWilliams-Franklin/Delisha Milton-Jones transaction.

Free agents

Additions

Subtractions

Roster

Season standings

Schedule

Preseason

|- align="center" bgcolor="bbffbb"
| 1 || May 31 || 3:00pm || @ Connecticut || 80-77 || Thompson (14) || Leslie, Wisdom-Hylton (6) || Lennox (4) || Mohegan Sun Arena  6,630 || 1-0
|-

Regular season

|- align="center" bgcolor="bbffbb"
| 1 || June 6 || 2:30pm || Detroit || ABC || 78-58 || Thompson (18) || Lennox (10) || Harrower (7) || STAPLES Center  13,154 || 1-0
|- align="center" bgcolor="ffbbbb"
| 2 || June 8 || 7:30pm || @ Detroit ||  || 52-81 || Thompson (14) || Thompson (11) || Milton-Jones, Quinn (3) || Palace of Auburn Hills  13,915 || 1-1
|- align="center" bgcolor="ffbbbb"
| 3 || June 10 || 8:00pm || @ Minnesota ||  || 76-87 || Lennox (25) || Lennox, Leslie (8) || Quinn (4) || Target Center  7,444 || 1-2
|- align="center" bgcolor="ffbbbb"
| 4 || June 12 || 7:00pm || @ Indiana ||  || 61-73 || Leslie (21) || Leslie (13) || Harrower (3) || Conseco Fieldhouse  9,320 || 1-3
|- align="center" bgcolor="ffbbbb"
| 5 || June 19 || 10:00pm || @ Phoenix ||  || 80-89 || Lennox (16) || Thompson (14) || Quinn (6) || US Airways Center  8,255 || 1-4
|- align="center" bgcolor="bbffbb"
| 6 || June 21 || 9:30pm || Sacramento || NBA TVFSNW || 67-47 || Hayden, Thompson (12) || Hayden, Lennox (8) || Bobbitt (5) || STAPLES Center  9,494 || 2-4
|- align="center" bgcolor="ffbbbb"
| 7 || June 26 || 10:00pm || @ Seattle ||  || 67-69 || Thompson (20) || Milton-Jones (7) || Lennox (5) || KeyArena  9,686 || 2-5
|- align="center" bgcolor="bbffbb"
| 8 || June 28 || 9:30pm || Seattle || NBA TVFSNW || 82-55 || Ferdinand-Harris (15) || Quinn (6) || Harrower (5) || STAPLES Center  10,797 || 3-5
|-

|- align="center" bgcolor="ffbbbb"
| 9 || July 5 || 9:30pm || Phoenix || NBA TVFSNW || 89-104 || Lennox, Thompson (17) || Milton-Jones (7) || Bobbitt (6) || STAPLES Center  9,872 || 3-6
|- align="center" bgcolor="bbffbb"
| 10 || July 9 || 7:30pm || @ New York || MSG || 69-60 || Lennox (20) || Thompson (8) || Harrower, Ferdinand-Harris (3) || Madison Square Garden  12,247 || 4-6
|- align="center" bgcolor="ffbbbb"
| 11 || July 11 || 7:00pm || @ Washington ||  || 63-75 || Bobbitt, Lennox (10) || Milton-Jones, Thompson (7) || Harrower (3) || Verizon Center  12,217 || 4-7
|- align="center" bgcolor="ffbbbb"
| 12 || July 14 || 7:00pm || @ Connecticut || ESPN2  || 71-82 || Milton-Jones (19) || Lennox (11) || Lennox, Milton-Jones, Parker (2) || Mohegan Sun Arena  6,612 || 4-8
|- align="center" bgcolor="ffbbbb"
| 13 || July 22 || 10:30pm || @ Seattle ||  || 87-98 (3OT) || Thompson (22) || Lennox (12) || Parker (5) || KeyArena  7,154 || 4-9
|- align="center" bgcolor="bbffbb"
| 14 || July 28 || 8:00pm || @ Minnesota ||  || 76-70 || Thompson (30) || Parker (10) || Lennox, Thompson (4) || Target Center  7,216 || 5-9
|- align="center" bgcolor="ffbbbb"
| 15 || July 29 || 8:00pm|| @ Chicago ||  || 63-75 || Milton-Jones (15) || Parker (10) || Thompson (4) || UIC Pavilion  5,633 || 5-10
|-

|- align="center" bgcolor="bbffbb"
| 16 || August 1 || 10:00pm || @ Sacramento ||  || 59-56 || Parker, Milton-Jones (13) || Parker (12) || Harrower (6) || ARCO Arena  7,204 || 6-10
|- align="center" bgcolor="ffbbbb"
| 17 || August 4 || 3:00pm || San Antonio ||  || 59-63 || Leslie, Quinn (13) || Thompson (12) || Quinn (4) || STAPLES Center  13,865 || 6-11
|- align="center" bgcolor="bbffbb"
| 18 || August 6 || 10:30pm || Seattle ||  || 79-75 (OT) || Quinn (23) || Parker (13) || Leslie (4) || STAPLES Center  9,735 || 7-11
|- align="center" bgcolor="bbffbb"
| 19 || August 10 || 10:30pm || Indiana ||  || 75-63 || Leslie (21) || Leslie (11) || Milton-Jones (4) || STAPLES Center  8,263 || 8-11
|- align="center" bgcolor="ffbbbb"
| 20 || August 11 || 9:00pm || New York || ESPN2 || 61-65 || Leslie (12) || Parker (11) || Bobbitt, Harrower, Quinn (2) || STAPLES Center  9,548 || 8-12
|- align="center" bgcolor="ffbbbb"
| 21 || August 14 || 10:30pm || Sacramento ||  || 79-85 || Leslie (25) || Parker (10) || Quinn (5) || STAPLES Center  10,122 || 8-13
|- align="center" bgcolor="bbffbb"
| 22 || August 15 || 10:00pm || @ Sacramento ||  || 78-61 || Parker (18) || Leslie (9) || Milton-Jones, Quinn, Thompson (4) || ARCO Arena  7,646 || 9-13
|- align="center" bgcolor="bbffbb"
| 23 || August 18 || 10:30pm || Washington ||  || 72-69 || Leslie (20) || Parker (12) || Parker, Quinn (5) || STAPLES Center  9,287 || 10-13
|- align="center" bgcolor="bbffbb"
| 24 || August 19 || 10:30pm || Minnesota ||  || 78-63 || Leslie (28) || Parker (10) || Quinn (7) || STAPLES Center  9,181 || 11-13
|- align="center" bgcolor="bbffbb"
| 25 || August 21 || 8:00pm || @ San Antonio || NBA TVKMYS || 67-66 (OT) || Parker (17) || Parker, Thompson (12) || Leslie (4) || AT&T Center  9,540 || 12-13
|- align="center" bgcolor="bbffbb"
| 26 || August 23 || 3:00pm || @ Atlanta ||  || 91-87 || Parker (23) || Lennox, Parker (8) || Thompson (6) || Philips Arena  11,304 || 13-13
|- align="center" bgcolor="bbffbb"
| 27 || August 25 || 10:00pm || Chicago || ESPN2 || 75-63 || Leslie, Parker (21) || Parker (12) || Bobbitt, Thompson (3) || STAPLES Center  9,615 || 14-13
|- align="center" bgcolor="ffbbbb"
| 28 || August 27 || 10:30pm || Phoenix || NBA TVFSNW || 90-98 || Leslie (23) || Lennox (6) || Quinn (8) || STAPLES Center  9,586 || 14-14
|- align="center" bgcolor="bbffbb"
| 29 || August 30 || 9:30pm || Connecticut || NBA TVFSNW || 91-81 || Thompson (21) || Parker (13) || Milton-Jones, Quinn (5) || STAPLES Center  11,072 || 15-14
|-

|- align="center" bgcolor="ffbbbb"
| 30 || September 1 || 10:30pm || Atlanta ||  || 79-84 || Leslie (24) || Parker (14) || Lennox (5) || STAPLES Center  8,756 || 15-15
|- align="center" bgcolor="ffbbbb"
| 31 || September 5 || 8:00pm || @ San Antonio ||  || 72-89 || Leslie (21) || Parker (10) || Parker (8) || AT&T Center  8,631 || 15-16
|- align="center" bgcolor="bbffbb"
| 32 || September 8 || 10:30pm || San Antonio || NBA TVKMYS || 76-68 || Leslie (18) || Parker (13) || Quinn (6) || STAPLES Center  10,476 || 16-16
|- align="center" bgcolor="bbffbb"
| 33 || September 11 || 10:30pm || Minnesota  || NBA TVFSNW || 90-64 || Leslie, Thompson (19) || Parker (14) || Quinn (9) || STAPLES Center  13,764 || 17-16
|- align="center" bgcolor="bbffbb"
| 34 || September 13 || 3:00pm || @ Phoenix || ESPN2 || 81–78 || Parker (24) || Parker (14) || Lennox (6) || US Airways Center12,968 || 18–16
|-

| All games are viewable on WNBA LiveAccess

Postseason

|- align="center" bgcolor="bbffbb"
| 1 || September 16 || 10:00pm || Seattle || ESPN2 || 70-63 || Thompson (16) || Leslie, Parker (10) || Harrower (5) || STAPLES Center  7,919 || 1-0
|- align="center" bgcolor="ffbbbb"
| 2 || September 18 || 10:00pm || @ Seattle || NBA TV || 74-75 || Lennox (17) || Leslie (14) || Quinn (5) || KeyArena  8,854 || 1-1
|- align="center" bgcolor="bbffbb"
| 3 || September 20 || 5:00pm || @ Seattle || ESPN2 || 75-64 || Parker (22) || Milton-Jones (9) || Quinn (7) || KeyArena  8,159 || 2-1
|-

|- align="center" bgcolor="ffbbbb"
| 1 || September 23 || 10:00pm || Phoenix || ESPN2 || 94-103 || Parker (28) || Parker (10) || Thompson (5) || Pauley Pavilion 6,389 ||0-1
|- align="center" bgcolor="bbffbb"
| 2 || September 25 || 10:00pm || @ Phoenix || NBA TV || 87-76 || Parker (24) || Parker (18) || Quinn (4) || US Airways Center  7,628 || 1-1
|- align="center" bgcolor="ffbbbb"
| 3 || September 26 || 10:00pm || @ Phoenix || NBA TV || 74-85 || Leslie (22) || Thompson (11) || Lennox, Thompson (3) || US Airways Center  7,226 || 1-2
|-

Regular Season Statistics

Player Statistics

Team Statistics

Awards and honors
 Candace Parker was named WNBA Western Conference Player of the Week for the week of August 17, 2009.
 Candace Parker was named WNBA Western Conference Player of the Week for the week of September 7, 2009.
 Lisa Leslie was named to the 2009 WNBA All-Star Team as a Western Conference starter.
 Tina Thompson was named to the 2009 WNBA All-Star Team as a Western Conference reserve.
 Candace Parker was named to the All-WNBA Second Team.
 Lisa Leslie was named to the All-WNBA Second Team.
 Candace Parker was named to the All-Defensive Second Team.

References

External links

Los Angeles Sparks seasons
Los Angeles
Los Angeles Sparks